In fluid mechanics, a shell balance can be used to determine how fluid velocity changes across a flow.

A shell is a differential element of the flow. By looking at the momentum and forces on one small portion, it is possible to integrate over the flow to see the larger picture of the flow as a whole. The balance is determining what goes into and out of the shell. Momentum is created within the shell through fluid entering and leaving the shell and by shear stress. In addition, there are pressure and gravitational forces on the shell. The goal of a shell balance is to determine the velocity profile of the flow. The velocity profile is an equation to calculate the velocity based on a specific location in the flow. From this, it is possible to find a velocity for any point across the flow.

Applications 

Shell Balances can be used in many situations. For example, flow in a pipe, the flow of multiple fluids around each other, or flow due to pressure difference. Although terms in the shell balance and boundary conditions will change, the basic set up and process is the same.

Requirements for Shell Balance Calculations

The fluid must exhibit:

Laminar flow
No bends or curves
Steady state
Two boundary conditions

Boundary Conditions are used to find constants of integration.

Fluid - Solid Boundary: No-slip condition, the velocity of a liquid at a solid is equal to the velocity of the solid.
Liquid - Gas Boundary: Shear stress = 0.
Liquid - Liquid Boundary: Equal velocity and shear stress on both liquids.

Performing shell balances 
A fluid is flowing between and in contact with two horizontal surfaces of contact area A. A differential shell of height Δy is utilized (see diagram below).

The top surface is moving at velocity U and the bottom surface is stationary.

Density of fluid = ρ 
Viscosity of fluid = μ 
Velocity in x direction = , shown by the diagonal line above. This is what a shell balance is solving for.

Conservation of Momentum is the Key of a Shell Balance

(Rate of momentum in) - (rate of momentum out) + (sum of all forces) = 0

To perform a shell balance, follow the following basic steps:

Find momentum from shear stress.(Momentum from Shear Stress Into System) - (Momentum from Shear Stress Out of System). Momentum from Shear Stress goes into the shell at y and leaves the system at y + Δy. Shear stress = τyx, area = A, momentum = τyxA.
Find momentum from the flow. Momentum flows into the system at x = 0 and out at x = L. The flow is steady state. Therefore, the momentum flow at x = 0 is equal to the moment of flow at x = L. Therefore, these cancel out.
Find gravity force on the shell.
Find pressure forces.
Plug into conservation of momentum and solve for τyx.
Apply Newton's law of viscosity for a Newtonian fluidτyx = -μ(dVx/dy).
Integrate to find the equation for velocity and use Boundary Conditions to find constants of integration.

Boundary 1: Top Surface: y = 0 and Vx = U

Boundary 2: Bottom Surface: y = D and Vx = 0

For examples of performing shell balances, visit the resources listed below.

Resources 

 Fluid mechanics